The United States Adult Soccer Association (USASA) is a national organization and sanctioning body for amateur soccer in the United States. It consists of 54 state organizations as well as regional and national leagues.

There are numerous adult leagues that are affiliated with the USASA. These leagues are mostly independent of each other, and the division rankings cannot be reliably compared between state or local organizations. There are affiliated leagues and national leagues, in which the national leagues operate leagues constructed out of localized conferences,  while multi-state and regional leagues operated leagues that focus on competition with less emphasize on national appeal. USASA has over 250,000 adult members within its leagues and teams.

National affiliates 
 National Premier Soccer League (NPSL)
 United Premier Soccer League (UPSL)
 USL League Two (USL2)
 Women's Premier Soccer League (WPSL)

Multi-state Leagues
 Gulf Coast Premier League
 Eastern Development Program (EDP U23 and U20)
 United Women's Soccer
 West Coast Soccer Association (WCSA)

Elite amateur leagues 
The elite league membership program is for the promotion of the top USASA leagues across the country. These leagues are part of the USASA structure as national leagues, regional leagues or members of a USASA state association.

Regional leagues

Region I

The first region of the four USASA regions are teams located in the Northeastern and Mid-Atlantic regions of the United States. The region includes the following state soccer associations:

 Connecticut State Soccer Association
Adult Soccer League of Connecticut
Connecticut Adult Recreational Soccer League
Connecticut Soccer League
CSSA U-23 Summer Soccer League
Shoreline Adult Soccer League (30+)
Southern New England Adult Soccer League (40+)
 Delaware Soccer Association
 Eastern New York State Soccer Association
 Eastern Pennsylvania Soccer Association
 Maryland State Soccer Association
 Massachusetts Adult State Soccer Association
 Metropolitan DC-VA Soccer Association
 New Hampshire Soccer Association
 New Jersey Soccer Association
 Pennsylvania West Soccer Association
 Rhode Island Soccer Association
 Vermont State Soccer Association
 West Virginia Soccer Association
 Western New York Soccer Association

Region II

Illinois
 Central Illinois Soccer League
 Chicago Champions SL
 Chicago SL
 Illinois Women's SL
 Kankakee Premier SL
 Metropolitan AH SL 
 Metropolitan SL
 National Soccer League
 Polish Highlanders SL
 Polish SL
 Premier SL Chicagoland
 Recreational Adult and Youth Soccer Association
 Southern Illinois Adult Soccer League
 Tricounty SL O40
 Westside Premier SL
 Windy City Wanderers FC
 World Soccer League

Indiana
 Central Indiana Adult Soccer League
 Central Indiana Women's Soccer League
 Ft. Wayne Adult Soccer League
 Latino Americana Sport Club
 Northwest Indiana Women's League
 Northwest Indiana Old Boys League
 Premier Soccer League
 Lafayette Soccer League

Iowa
 Cedar Valley Adult Soccer Association
 Central Iowa Co-ed Soccer League
 Dubuque Soccer Club
 Latin America Soccer League
 Latino Unidos
 Liga Latina de Futbol

Kansas
 Dodge City
 Garden City
 Kansas City
 Leavenworth Adult League
 Johnson County Adult Soccer League
 Kansas Rush Adult Soccer League
 Kansas Soccer League Wichita
 Lawrence Adult Soccer League
 Emporia Soccer League

Kentucky
 Greater Louisville Soccer League
 Kentucky Amateur Soccer League
 Latino's Soccer League
 Lexington Amateur
 Lexington Women's Soccer League
 Louisville Soccer Amateur League
 Organization de Futbol Independent Soccer League
 Woodford Adult Soccer League

Michigan
 Ann Arbor Premier Development League
 Ann Arbor Soccer Association
 Blossomland Soccer League
 Great Lakes Women Soccer League
 Kalamazoo Area Soccer League
 Metro Detroit Soccer League
 Michigan United Soccer League
 Michigan Premier Soccer League
 Mid-Michigan Soccer League
 Midland Soccer Club Adult League

Minnesota
 American Champions League
 Duluth Amateur Soccer League/Duluth Women's Soccer League
 Minnesota Amateur Soccer League
 Minnesota Recreational Soccer League
 Minnesota Women's Soccer League
 Southern Minnesota Amateur Soccer Association

Nebraska
 Nebraska Men's Soccer League
 Omaha Latino Soccer League
 South Omaha Soccer League

Ohio

North 
 Akron Premier League (APL) https://akronpremierleague.com/
 North Ohio Amateur Soccer Association (NOASA) http://noasa.bonzidev.com/
 North Coast Soccer League
 Northwest Ohio Champions League (defunct)
 Northern Ohio Soccer League (NOSL) https://www.noslsoccer.com/

South 
 Columbus Premier Soccer League
 Dayton Amateur Soccer League
 Cincinnati Champions League

Wisconsin
 WSL Majors
 WSL U23
 WSL First Division
 Wisconsin Primary Amateur Soccer League (WPASL)

Region III

Florida
 Central Florida Soccer League
 Florida Gold Coast League
 Florida Suncoast Soccer League

Louisiana
 ISLANO (International Soccer League Association New Orleans)

North Carolina
 Triangle Adult Soccer League
 Metrolina Adult Soccer League- Charlotte

South Carolina
 Charleston Soccer League

Texas
 Texas Premier Soccer League
 North Texas Premier Soccer Association

Region IV

Alaska State Soccer Association
 Soccer Alaska (Anchorage)
 Fairbanks Soccer Association (Fairbanks)
 Capital City Soccer League (Juneau)

Arizona State Soccer Association
 Arizona Women's Soccer League
 Sierra Vista Soccer League
 Sierra Vista Women's Soccer League
 Tucson Metro Soccer League
 Tucson Women's Soccer League

California Soccer Association - North
 Alameda County Over 35 Soccer League
 Albany Soccer League
 Central California Soccer League
 Fiji US Sports Soccer League
 Fraternidad Soccer League
 Golden Gate Women's Soccer League
 Interamerica Soccer League
 Marin Soccer League, CA
 Monterey Peninsula Soccer League
 North Coast Soccer League, CA
 Papy Soccer League
 Peninsula Soccer League
 San Francisco Soccer Football League
 Sacramento Adult Soccer League
 San Joaquin Soccer League
 San Joaquin Valley Soccer League

California Soccer Association - South
 Adult Soccer League of Simi Valley
 City of Hawaiian Gardens Soccer League
 City of Victorville Adult Soccer League
 Coachella Valley Premier Soccer League
 Coast Soccer League
 Golden Valley Soccer League
 La Gran Liga de Oxnard
 Laguna Niguel Football Association
 Los Angeles City Municipal Sports League
 Los Angeles Premier League
 Orcutt United Adult Soccer League
 San Diego County Soccer League
 So Cal Premier League
 South Western Adult Soccer League
 Tri Counties Soccer League
 United Premier Veterans Soccer League

Colorado State Soccer Association
 Colorado Mountain United Soccer League
 Denver Kickers Sport Club League
 High Plains Coed Soccer League

Hawaii Soccer Association
 Co-ed Soccer Association of Hawaii
 Hawaii Ranger Soccer League
 Major Island Soccer Organization
 Men's Island Soccer Organization
 Kauai COED
 Kauai Soccer Association
 Maui Soccer Association
 Valley Isle COED Soccer League

Idaho State Soccer Association
 Idaho Falls Adult Soccer Association
 Lega Azteca
 Liga de Fot-Bol Valle Magico
 Primetime Co-Ed Soccer League
 Southern Idaho Soccer League

Utah Soccer Association
 Co-ed
 Men's Open (GSLSL)
 Men's Over-30 (FSL)
 Men's Over-35 (VSL)
 Men's Over-40 (OHSL)

References

External links
 United States Adult Soccer Association - Regions & Affiliates

United States Adult Soccer Association leagues